Digestive Diseases and Sciences, formerly known as the American Journal of Digestive Diseases, is a monthly peer-reviewed journal focusing on gastroenterology and hepatology. It is published by Springer Science+Business Media and the editor-in-chief is Jonathan Kaunitz (David Geffen School of Medicine). According to the Journal Citation Reports, the journal has a 2021 impact factor of 3.487 (2021) and a 5-year impact factor of 3.522.

References

External links

Gastroenterology and hepatology journals
Springer Science+Business Media academic journals
Publications established in 1979
Monthly journals